Lydellina is a genus of parasitic flies in the family Tachinidae. There are about five described species in Lydellina.

Species
These five species belong to the genus Lydellina:
 Lydellina anorbitalis Mesnil, 1970
 Lydellina distincta Mesnil, 1970
 Lydellina frontalis Mesnil, 1970
 Lydellina umbripennis Mesnil, 1970
 Lydellina villeneuvei Townsend, 1933

References

Further reading

 
 
 
 

Tachinidae
Articles created by Qbugbot